Su Xiaoxiao (c.479 – c.501), sometimes by the appellation "Little Su", was a famous Chinese courtesan and poet from Qiantang City (now Hangzhou, Zhejiang Province) in the Southern Qi Dynasty. She had a sister named Su Pannu.

Life and career 
Well known for her intellectual talent and great beauty, Su Xiaoxiao pursued the values of love, beauty and humanity, as reflected in her writing and in popular stories. There are many stories attached to the life of Su Xiaoxiao, with no way of knowing the historical accuracy of any single story.  One such story has her meeting a young scholar travelling in a state of dire poverty, hoping to reach the capital to sit the official examinations. She gave the scholar several nuggets of silver from her purse, but sadly he never returned to her after completing the examinations.  In any event, it seems that she did not wish to be a man's wife or mistress, preferring to share her beauty with the common people while showing a certain contempt for the wealthy.

In her late teens, Su Xiaoxiao developed a terminal illness, during which she took the view that heaven was giving her the special opportunity to leave a legacy of beauty in her memory through her death at a young age. She died at a mere 19 years of age. For more than a thousand years, her tomb was situated at the Xilin Bridge beside her beloved West Lake.

Su Xiaoxiao's life and poetry provided much inspiration for later Chinese writers and artists. She was the romantic heroine of Tang dynasty poets Bai Juyi, Li He, Wen Tingyun, and Ming dynasty writer Zhang Dai, also the heroine of the story "Romantic Trails of Xilin" in Fine Stories of the West Lake. A woodcut of unknown provenance was used to illustrate porcelain objects during the Ming dynasty and early Qing dynasty. The woodcut was based on the short story "Dreaming of Qiantang", which told of the scholar Sima Yu, who, while visiting Hangzhou, wrote a poem about a dream he had in which Su Xiaoxiao was brought by three gusts of wind to come and sing at his window. Su was also a frequent figure for portrayal in Chinese theater.

Su Xiaoxiao's tomb was destroyed during the Cultural Revolution, but it was rebuilt in 2004, complete with a brand new pavilion decorated with twelve poetry posts handwritten by famous calligraphers. The current tomb is empty. Su Xiaoxiao's tomb is now again a major tourist site in Hangzhou. Since the pavilion the tomb is hosted under is named Mucaiting, which could be misread phonetically as Mocaiting (touch for wealth), many tourist walk by would purposefully touch or throw coins on the tomb for hope of wealth and prosperity. Su Xiaoxiao is also the heroine of TV series Loving Courtesan Su Xiaoxiao.

Poem by Su Xiaoxiao 
This poem is variously known as "Song of the West Tomb", "Song of Xiling Lake", "Song of Su Xiaoxiao" (in a collection of Music Bureau poems) and "Song of the Same Heartbeat". It became very well known and inspired many future poets including those named above.  In the original text, the poem is a quatrain composed of four lines of five words each.

,
,
,
。

I ride in a decorated carriage,
My darling rides a blue-white horse.
Where should we tie the knot for our heart?
Under the Xiling pine and cypress.

In media
In 1962, Chinese director, Lee Sun-fung, directed a film about Su Xiaoxiao called Su Xiaoxiao, or Miss Su in some areas. Malaysian born actress Yan Pak played the title role.

 A Su Xiaoxiao , poem dedicated by the Italian writer Sabrina Gatti, in the collection  La pioggia sui vetri  (2011)

See also 
 West Lake
 Yongming poetry

References

Sources 
 
 
 Melangzhi : 西湖佳话 (Fine Stories of West Lake) /I
 
 Zhang Dai: 西湖梦寻(Search The West Lake in Dreams)

External links 

  Tomb of Su Xiaoxiao, a poem by Li He

5th-century births
501 deaths
Chinese women poets
Southern Qi poets
Women of medieval China
5th-century writers
Chinese courtesans
5th-century Chinese poets
Writers from Hangzhou
Poets from Zhejiang
Burials in Hangzhou
5th-century Chinese women writers
6th-century Chinese women writers
5th-century Chinese musicians